The Border Guard Bangladesh (BGB) is a paramilitary force responsible for the border security of Bangladesh. The force is known as "The Vigilant Sentinels of the National Frontier". The BGB is entrusted with the responsibility to defend the  border of Bangladesh. It was formerly known as the Bangladesh Rifles (BDR).

BGB boasts a military history spanning over two centuries. During peacetime this force is also responsible for anti-smuggling operations, investigating cross border crime and extending governmental authority to remote and isolated areas. From time to time BGB has also been called upon to assist the administration in the maintenance of internal law & order, relief and rehabilitation work after any kind of natural disaster. During wartime BGB comes under the control of the Ministry of Defence as an auxiliary force to the Bangladesh Army.

History

Formation and pre-1947

Ramgarh Local Battalion 
The Ramgarh Local Battalion was established on 29 June 1795 at the city of Ramgarh, consisting of 486 personnel, known as the "Frontier Protection Force", under the command of the East India Company. Later the force was converted into a paramilitary unit with its own name (Ramgarh Local Battalion) and uniform. At that time its primary responsibility was to suppress insurgent activities around the Ramgarh area.

Special Reserve Company 
During 1799, the force established its first camp at Pilkhana, where the headquarters remain to this day. The camp unit then was known as "Special Reserve Company".

Frontier Guards 
The Ramgarh Local Battalion was renamed the "Frontier Guards", and remained so for thirty years from 1861 to 1891.

Bengal Military Police 
From 1891 till 1920, the Frontier Guards were re-organized, equipped with modern weapons and renamed once again as the "Bengal Military Police". Commanded by a Subedar (Senior Warrant Officer), the BMP had four companies located in Dhaka, Dhumka and Gangtok. This force also participated in the First World War.

Eastern Frontier Rifles 
The BMP was reorganised yet once again and renamed the "Eastern Frontier Rifles" in 1920. Its primary task was to protect the borders. It also took part in numerous military operations during the Second World War.

East Pakistan Rifles

After the partition of India, the Eastern Frontier Rifles were re-grouped and renamed the "East Pakistan Rifles" (EPR) in 1947. It was the primary border protection force of East Pakistan. A number of Metropolitan Armed Police of Calcutta and some 1,000 ex-soldiers of West Pakistan merged into this force. Officers from the army were transferred to command and reorganize EPR. In 1958, it was also assigned anti-smuggling duties on top of its primary role as border guards. Major Tufail Mohammad was awarded the highest military award of Pakistan, 'Nishan-e-Haider', for his action in the Laksmipur Operation. In the Indo-Pakistani War of 1965 this force fought in a number of skirmishes in Lathitila, Dohogram, Laksmipur, Assalong and Boroibari.

Bangladesh Liberation War 1971
During the Bangladesh Liberation War of 1971, nearly nine thousand of the members of the East Pakistan Rifles (EPR) turned against the Pakistan Army following the Declaration of Independence of Bangladesh at Kalurghat Radio Station, Chittagong. Eight hundred and seventeen EPR personnel were subsequently reported as being killed in action. The East Pakistan Rifles were the border security and anti-smuggling force stationed in what was to become independent Bangladesh. It was commanded by Junior Commissioned Officers (JCO) at the company level. All EPR companies were based within  of the international boundary. There were two senior commissioned officers, seconded from the Pakistan Army in command of each Wing (battalion) of the EPR. In March 1971, there were 12 EPR Wings. The entire force according to CIA estimates had 10,000 enlisted personnel.

At the outbreak of the Bangladesh Liberation War, the EPR were the first Bengali military unit to defect from the Pakistan forces; moving to Sholashahar and the main military cantonment, while calling on all Bengali soldiers to join them. Reportedly West Pakistani officers serving with the EPR were executed by their Bengali colleagues. On 26 March, the Pakistan Army sent troops to suppress the EPR. The EPR ambushed them but the Pakistanis managed to encircle them. As a result, the EPR took heavy losses at Kumira.

Bangladesh Rifles
On 29 January 1972, the East Pakistan Rifles were renamed the Bangladesh Rifles with the officers seconded from Bangladesh Army. Bangladesh Rifles initially had 9 thousand personnel in 1971 which by 1973 had increased to 20 thousand. Bangladesh Rifles and Indian Border Security Forces exchanged fired near the Comilla-Tripura border throughout the entire month of December 1979. In 1996 Bangladesh Rifles personal had grown to 69 thousand.

Bangladesh–India border clashes 2001

The 2001 Indian–Bangladeshi border conflict took place in the third week of April 2001 between companies of the Bangladesh Rifles and the Indian Border Security Force on the poorly marked international border between the two countries. This was the worst border conflict Bangladesh was involved in since Independence. The 16–19 April fighting took place around the village of Padua (known as Pyrdiwah in India), which adjoins the Indian state of Meghalaya and the Timbil area of the Bangladesh border in the Sylhet district. In that area, 6.5 kilometres of the border have remained in dispute for the past 30 years. The trigger for the clash appears to have been an attempt by Indian forces to construct a footpath from an army outpost in Padua across a disputed territory some 300 metres wide to Indian Meghalaya.
On 15 April 2001, the BDR attacked and captured Pyrdiwah village.
Both sides later deescalated and returned to the original positions on the border. This incident left 16 Indian Border Security Force paramilitary men dead and 3 Bangladesh Rifles men dead with 5 other BDR troops injured.

On 19 April 2005, two BSF personnel were killed in an encounter with Bangladesh Rifles inside Bangladesh territory. According to Bangladesh side, the BSF personnel entered Bangladesh without uniforms and attacked a village. According to India they were dragged into Bangladesh and knifed to death.

BDR Mutiny 2009

On 25 February 2009, regular BDR soldiers mutinied against their officers who were seconded from the Bangladesh Army. The mutiny took place when senior commanders were in Dhaka for convocation or durbar. A total of 74 people were killed in the Mutiny. Many senior officers were killed, including almost the entire higher echelon of the command structure – about 57 army officers who were present in the Bangladesh Rifles' headquarters in the capital Dhaka. These included the Director General of the BDR. The soldiers mutinied due to reasons which largely remain unknown, though resentment at officers being seconded from Bangladesh army and allegations of corruption are believed to have been among the causes.

After 30 hours, being surrounded by Bangladesh Army tanks, the mutineers surrendered with about 6,000 of them taken under arrest, ending the mutiny. In November 2013, Bangladesh sentenced 152 mutineers from Bangladesh Rifles to death.

Border Guards Bangladesh
In the aftermath of the mutiny, the Border Guard Bangladesh Act was issued in 2010 and caused the Bangladesh Rifles was reorganised with new recruits. The force is still commanded by senior officers seconded from the Bangladesh Army. The Bangladesh Rifles have gone through some fundamental changes since 2010. It was officially renamed as the Border Guard Bangladesh (BGB) on 23 January 2011 and reorganised with fresh recruits, also formed their own intelligence unit. The Border Guard Bangladesh Act, 2010 increased the maximum punishment for mutiny from 7 years in jail to the death penalty.

News reports in 2018 stated the BGB had "54,000 troopers". The 2020 edition of The Military Balance put the force's personnel strength at 38,000, organized in 54 battalions and one riverine company.

Bangladesh–Myanmar border skirmish 2015
On 28 May 2014, during a routine patrol of the BGB in Bandarban District, along the Bangladesh-Myanmar border, Myanmar Border Police began firing on the BGB patrol. The incident took the life of Border Guard Corporal Mizanur Rahman (43). The body of the slain soldier was then carried over the border by Myanmar Border Police. On 30 May upon request of the Myanmar Ambassador to Bangladesh a BGB team was waiting near border pillar no. 52 for identification of the dead body which was proposed by the Myanmar side. However, to the complete surprise of the BGB, Myanmar border forces suddenly started firing on the waiting BGB team without any provocation resulting in the BGB team returning fire. Both sides deescalated and agreed to a cease fire and on the following day Myanmar returned the dead body of BGB Corporal Mizanur Rahman. Bangladesh's Ministry of Foreign Affairs had protested strongly to the Burmese ambassador over the unprovoked eruption of gunfire by Burmese border troops.

Bangladesh–Arakan Army border clash 2015
On 26 August 2015 the Arakan Army, a separatist group in Myanmar, attacked a BGB patrol in Boro Modak, Thanchi, Bandarban. Two border guards were injured in the attack. On 11 May 2015 the BGB camp in Thanchi came under mortar fire, BGB retaliated by firing two rounds towards the border. Indian BSF agreed to allow BGB to use BSF roads in India to patrol the border on 1 August 2016. On 15 November 2016 Border Guards Bangladesh stopped 86 Rohingyas from entering Bangladesh on two boats. On 6 February 2017 BGB protested with their counterparts in Myanmar Border Guard Police, after they shot and killed a Bangladeshi fisherman in the Naf River. BGB deployed its first female border guards on 24 February 2017 in the Dinajpur border area. BGB and Myanmar Police Force came to an agreement on 6 April 2017 to remove mines from the border area.

Women Guards
The force has female soldiers since 2016.

Decorations
The then-East Pakistan Rifles joined the Bangladesh War of Independence on the side of Mukti Bahini in 1971. One hundred and forty one members earned gallantry awards for their outstanding contribution to the liberation war of Bangladesh. Naik Nur Mohammad Sheikh and Naik Munshi Abdur Rouf posthumously earned the Bir Sreshtha, which is the highest gallantry award of the nation. Birshrestha Noor Mohammad Public College and Birshreshtha Munshi Abdur Rouf Public College are educational institutions of the guards named after them. 8 earned the Bir Uttom. 40 earned the Bir Bikram and 91 earned the Bir Protik awards.

Medals 

  Border Guard Bangladesh Padak (Bravery)
 President Border Guard Padak (Bravery)
 Border Guard Bangladesh Padak (Service)
 President Border Guard Padak (Service)
  Bi-Centennial Padak
  Naf Padak

After independence, on 3 March 1972 the force had been renamed as Bangladesh Rifles. As a mark of recognition for the courage and bravery of its members, BDR introduced 'Bangladesh Rifles Podok' in 1985 and President Rifles podok' in 1989. 21 members had received the 'Bangladesh Rifles Podok' 29 had received the 'President Rifles Podok'.

Responsibilities
 Patrolling and securing the border
 Investigating cross border crimes
 Anti-smuggling Operations
 Counter Terrorism
 Domestic law enforcement during national emergencies
 Acting as a reserve force under Ministry of Defence during war

Director Generals

Equipment

Organization
The BGB is commanded by a Major General ranked Bangladesh Army officer. The BGB administration and most of the officer corps are trained and deputed from the Bangladesh Army. There are, however, around 100 officers who are promoted from within the force itself.  They can be promoted as high as deputy director (equivalent to captain in Bangladesh Army.

BGB is organised into a central headquarters and five regional headquarters. The regions of BGB are equivalent to brigades and commanded by brigadier generals deputed from the Bangladesh Army. Under the regional headquarters, there are a total of 16 sectors. The sectors are commanded by colonels. Under each sectors, there are multiple battalions which are commanded by lieutenant colonels. A battalion has six rifle companies, one support company and one HQ company. Army officers of the rank of captain command the companies and officers of the rank of major fill billets of battalion second-in-command, adjutant, battalion intelligence officer and staff positions in Pilkhana HQ and the training establishments. However one-third of company commanders are promotee BGB officers holding the rank of assistant director (captain equivalent). This is the second-highest rank achievable for a BGB departmental officer. A subedar usually holds the responsibility of the company second-in-command and company quartermaster. Each company has four platoons and each platoon is led by a naib subedar, with a havildar as second-in-command. The highest rank for a promotee BGB soldiers, deputy director (major equivalent), fill the billets of battalion adjutant and battalion logistics officers. The subedar-major (lieutenant equivalent) similarly fills the billets of battalion subedar major (ceremonial post) and head Instructors in training establishments and depots.  Each Platoon has three sections and each section is commanded by a Naik, with a Lance naik as second-in-command. Each section has two to three teams and the team is led by a lance naik. A BGB personnel is not eligible to lead sections, platoons and companies or hold posts of second-in-command if they are over 40 years of age and those in such positions receive additional 'command allowance'. Its current strength is 70,000 structured along 64 battalions and numerous border outposts (BOP), mostly along the borders.

 Central HQ: Pilkhana, Dhaka
 Director-General (DG)
 Additional Director-General (Headquarters)
 Additional Director General (Operations and Training)
 Additional Director General (Administration)
 Additional Director General (Medical)
 Additional Director General/Bureau Chief (Border Security Bureau)
 Additional Director General/Commandant (Border Guard Training Centre and College)
 Deputy Director General (Records)
 Deputy Director General (Logistics)
 Deputy Director General (Budget)
 Deputy Director General (Central Purchase)
 Deputy Director General (Construction Works)
 Deputy Director General (Communications)
 Sector Command (Dhaka)
 HQ Battalion
 ICT Battalion
 North Eastern Regional HQ: Sarail
 Region Commander (RC)
 Sector Command (Comilla)
 Sector Command (Mymensingh)
 Sector Command (Srimangal)
 Sector Command (Sylhet)
 Regional Intelligence Bureau (Sarail)
 North Western Regional HQ: Rangpur
 Region Commander (RC)
 Sector Command (Dinajpur):
 Sector Command (Rajshahi)
 Sector Command (Rangpur)
 Sector Command (Thakurgaon)
 Regional Intelligence Bureau (Rangpur)
 South Eastern Regional HQ: Halishahar 
 Region Commander (RC)
 Sector Command (Rangamati)
 Sector Command (Khagrachari)
 Sector Command (Guimara)
 Chattagram Reserve Battalion
 Regional Intelligence Bureau (Halishahar)
 South Western Regional HQ: Jessore
 Region Commander (RC)
 Sector Command (Kushtia)
 Sector Command (Khulna) 
 Regional Intelligence Bureau (Jessore)
 Cox's Bazar Regional HQ: Cox's Bazar
 Region Commander (RC)
 Sector Command (Ramu)
 Sector Command (Bandarban)
 Regional Intelligence Bureau (Cox's Bazar)

Future modernization programme

BGB has adopted a long term modernization plan named "BGB Vision 2041" in 2017. The plan intends to make BGB a well-trained, well-equipped and technologically advanced force.
In short terms, BGB plans for structural and manpower expansion. A new region (equivalent to division) will be raised in Ramu of Cox's Bazar. Three new sectors (equivalent to brigade) will be raised at Ali Kadam of Bandarban, Naogaon and Jessore. Eight new battalions will be formed at Jhikargacha of Jessore, Meherpur, Khagrachari, Boro Mowdok of Bandarban, Gazipur, Narayanganj and Kulaura. Two riverine battalions will be raised in BGB at Nildumur of Shatkhira and Teknaf of Cox's Bazar. They are the first two units of BGB who will be able to operate in riverine borders and chars (River island). The number of personnel will be increased from 50000 to 65000 soon. 124 Border Out Posts (BOP) and 70 heli-support BOPs are being set up in the border areas of hilly districts along the border with Myanmar. 128 Border Sentri Posts (BSP) are being constructed between the distant BOPs. BGB members ae being equipped with bulletproof vests and ballistic helmet.

A Quick Response Force will be established for BGB. The force will work to supply modern arms and ammunition swiftly to border points in case of any emergency. For smooth operation in the border areas, border roads are being constructed. In BGB day 2017, prime minister said that the government has undertaken a plan to construct a total of 3,167 km ring road across the borders with India and Myanmar.

BGB has already bought two Mi-171E helicopters from Russia for its aviation wing at a cost of Tk. 355.10 crore.

To effectively monitor the border, BGB plans to add modern technology to the border management. The plan is to set up cameras, night vision goggles and infrared sensors throughout the border. BGB plans to achieve 3I (Information, Identification, Intervention) capabilities in the border in long term. Having Radar and Satellite monitoring facilities in the border are also planned.

References
 

 
Military of Bangladesh
Bangladesh Liberation War
Borders of Bangladesh
Paramilitary forces of Bangladesh
1795 establishments in the British Empire
Government agencies of Bangladesh
Uniformed services of Bangladesh